Cerro Largo is a corregimiento in Ocú District, Herrera Province, Panama with a population of 1,478 as of 2010. Its population as of 1990 was 2,121; its population as of 2000 was 1,800.

References

Corregimientos of Herrera Province